Barataria may refer to:

Places
Trinidad and Tobago
Barataria, Trinidad and Tobago

United States
Barataria, Louisiana, a census-designated place (CDP) in Jefferson Parish
Barataria Bay (sometimes "Barrataria Bay"), Louisiana
Barataria Preserve, part of Jean Lafitte National Historical Park and Preserve, Louisiana
Bayou Barataria, which drains into Barataria Bay

In fiction
Barataria, a fictional ínsula ("isle") awarded by some noblemen to Sancho Panza as a prank in Part II of Cervantes' Don Quixote (from the Spanish word barato, meaning cheap)
Barataria, a fictional republican kingdom in Gilbert and Sullivan's comic opera The Gondoliers
Castle Barataria, a castle on Planet X in the CRPG Ultima II: The Revenge of the Enchantress

Ships
USC&GS Barataria (1867), a survey ship in service with the United States Coast Survey from 1867 to 1878 and with the United States Coast and Geodetic Survey from 1878 to 1885
USCGC Barataria (WAVP-381), later WHEC-381, a United States Coast Guard cutter in service from 1949 to 1969
USS Barataria, the name of more than one United States Navy ship